The 1958 Five Nations Championship was the twenty-ninth series of the rugby union Five Nations Championship. Including the previous incarnations as the Home Nations and Five Nations, this was the sixty-fourth series of the northern hemisphere rugby union championship. Ten matches were played between January 11 and April 19. It was contested by England, France, Ireland, Scotland and Wales.

Participants
The teams involved were:

Table

Results

External links

The official RBS Six Nations Site

Six Nations Championship seasons
Five Nations
Five Nations
Five Nations
Five Nations
Five Nations
Five Nations
Five Nations
Five Nations
Five Nations
Five Nations